The Sultan Abdul Aziz Shah Jamek Mosque is the first mosque in the old town of Petaling Jaya, Selangor, Malaysia.

See also
 Islam in Malaysia

Mosques in Selangor
Petaling Jaya